Greatest Hits 1982–1989 is the third greatest hits album, and twentieth album overall, by the American band Chicago, released by Full Moon/Reprise Records on November 21, 1989. Spanning from Chicago 16 in 1982 to Chicago 19 in 1988, the set includes founding vocalist Peter Cetera and his successor Jason Scheff. It includes a remix of "What Kind of Man Would I Be?", as well as also being Chicago's last release before the dismissal of its original drummer Danny Seraphine in the following year after its release. 

A variation titled The Heart of... Chicago was issued in countries outside North America, with similar artwork but a different track list including four songs originally released on the Columbia record label.

Track listing Greatest Hits 1982–1989 
"Hard to Say I'm Sorry/Get Away" (Peter Cetera, David Foster, Robert Lamm) – 5:07
"Look Away" (Diane Warren) – 4:03
"Stay the Night" (Cetera, Foster) – 3:49
"Will You Still Love Me?" (Foster, Tom Keane, Richard Baskin) – 5:43
"Love Me Tomorrow" (Cetera, Foster) – 5:06
"What Kind of Man Would I Be?" (Remix) (Jason Scheff, Chas Sandford, Bobby Caldwell) – 4:14
"You're the Inspiration" (Cetera, Foster) – 3:50
"I Don't Wanna Live Without Your Love" (Warren, Albert Hammond) – 3:52
"Hard Habit to Break" (Steve Kipner, Jon Parker) – 4:44
"Along Comes a Woman" (Cetera, Mark Goldenberg) – 4:16
"If She Would Have Been Faithful..." (Kipner, Randy Goodrum) – 3:53
"We Can Last Forever" (Scheff, John Dexter) – 3:44

Unlike the two previous Greatest Hits albums, all of the songs were in their original album lengths, except "What Kind of Man Would I Be?". Some US copies on vinyl, and possibly some CDs, list "Along Comes a Woman" but actually contain "Remember the Feeling" (originally the flipside of "Hard Habit to Break").

Track listing The Heart of... Chicago

Charts

Weekly charts

Certifications

Greatest Hits 1982–1989

The Heart of... Chicago

Singles

References

1989 greatest hits albums
Albums produced by David Foster
Albums produced by Ron Nevison
Chicago (band) compilation albums